The 1924–25 Irish Cup was the 45th edition of the premier knock-out cup competition in Northern Irish football. 

Distillery won the tournament for the 10th time, defeating Glentoran 2–1 in the final at Solitude.

Results

First round

|}

Replay

|}

Second replay

|}

Third replay

|}

Quarter-finals

|}

Replay

|}

Second replay

|}

Semi-finals

|}

Final

References

External links
 Northern Ireland Cup Finals. Rec.Sport.Soccer Statistics Foundation (RSSSF)

Irish Cup seasons
1924–25 domestic association football cups
1924–25 in Northern Ireland association football